The Pwalugu Multipurpose Dam is a planned dam across the White Volta River, in Ghana. The reservoir is expected to provide irrigation water to an estimated  of agricultural land. It will also supply drinking water to populations living downstream of the infrastructure.

Location
The power station would be on the White Volta River, along the Tamale–Bolgatanga Road, at the border of the Upper East Region and the North East Region.

Overview
The dam at this location has been in the country's plans as far back as the 1990s. In 2013, with financial help from the French Development Agency (ADF), and technical assistance from the World Bank, an  Environmental and Social Impact Assessment (ESIA) and feasibility study for the construction of a multi-purpose dam and irrigation scheme, were carried out for this site.

In April 2021 the Ghanaian ministerial cabinet approved the project. There had been hesitation to approve the developmental infrastructure project due to the high construction bill, budgeted at US$993 million.

It is reported that the 60 megawatts of hydroelectricity generated here will be complemented by a 50 megawatt solar park to be constructed at Kurugu, in East Mamprusi Municipal District, in the North East Region. When completed this combined hydroelectricity/solar power complex will be the first of its kind in Ghana.

Funding
The renewable energy infrastructure project is being developed by the government of Ghana. Partial funding for the early statges was received from the Agence française de développement and the World Bank Group.

Other considerations
In March 2020, it was reported that the engineering, procurement and construction (EPC) contract had been awarded to PowerChina, with a 50 months construction period. Completion is therefore expected in the second half of 2024.

See also

List of power stations in Ghana
Akanyaru Multipurpose Dam

References

External links
 Future Location of Pwalugu Multipurpose Dam

Hydroelectric power stations in Ghana
Dams in Ghana
Proposed hydroelectric power stations
Volta River Authority
North East Region, Ghana